Mary C. Pangborn (13 August 1907 – 20 February 2003) was an American writer of science fiction.

Born in Brooklyn, Pangborn published a number of pieces of short fiction in noted anthologies and in The Magazine of Fantasy & Science Fiction. Her only novel, Friar Bacon's Head, remained unpublished as of her death.
Science fiction author Edgar Pangborn was her younger brother.

References

External links

American science fiction writers
American women short story writers
Writers from Brooklyn
1907 births
2003 deaths
Place of death missing
20th-century American short story writers
Women science fiction and fantasy writers
20th-century American women writers
21st-century American women